The Frogmen is a 1951 American black-and-white World War II drama film from Twentieth Century Fox, produced by Samuel G. Engel, directed by Lloyd Bacon, that stars Richard Widmark, Dana Andrews, and Gary Merrill. The film's storyline is based on operations by United States Navy Underwater Demolition Teams, popularly known as "frogmen", against the Japanese Army and naval forces. It was the first such film about scuba diving and became a popular cultural hit.

Following the opening credits, The Frogmen has an on-screen written statement:

"This is a true story based on incidents which occurred in the latter part of World War II. It deals with one of the most hazardous and unique branches of the Armed Forces ... the Underwater Demolition Teams. This film could not have been produced without the active cooperation of the Department of Defense and the United States Navy".

Underwater Demolition Teams have been used since World War II for reconnaissance duties, clearing underwater obstacles planted by the enemy, advance landings on beaches, and offensive underwater attacks on enemy ships; they were the forerunners of the Navy SEALs.

At the 24th Academy Awards for films from 1951, the film was nominated for Best Cinematography (Black-and-White) for Norbert Brodine and Best Screenplay (Motion Picture Story) for Oscar Millard. However, the award for Cinematography went to A Place in the Sun (William C. Mellor) while the Story award went to Seven Days to Noon (Paul Dehn and James Bernard).

Plot
During World War II, Navy Lt. Cmdr. John Lawrence (Richard Widmark), a strict disciplinarian, is put in charge of Underwater Demolition Team 4 after its former leader, Lt. Cmdr. Jack Cassidy, is killed in action. The unit's men are distrustful of the professionally aloof Lawrence, and the relationship immediately takes a turn for the worse when they brawl with sailors aboard their transport ship. The ship's captain, Lt. Cmdr. Pete Vincent (Gary Merrill), understands the natural resentment the elite UDT men feel over the death of Cassidy, which they have transferred to Lawrence, and offers to go easy on the team at captain's mast. The "by-the-book" Lawrence, however, elects to hold his own mast and disciplines the entire team just before a dangerous reconnaissance mission to ascertain the safest landing beach during an upcoming invasion of a Japanese-held island. Lawrence is scornfully perceived as afraid when he splits up the platoon and puts team executive officer Lt. Klinger in charge of a diversion to the more dangerous beach, where the main landing is scheduled.

During the mission, Lawrence cuts his leg on coral, and the diversionary section's pick-up boat receives a direct hit from artillery during pick-up operations, killing Klinger and most of his men. Lawrence sees that two frogmen, including Chief Jake Flannigan (Dana Andrews), are still in the water, but rather than risk loss of the information already gathered, orders a rescue boat launched and continues back to the transport. The rescue succeeds in recovering the two swimmers, but Lawrence's apparently cowardly action increases the unit's ill will toward him. An embittered Flannigan and some of the others request transfer to another unit, but Lawrence insists that they first complete the next day's mission to clear the new landing site for the invasion.

The next morning, Lawrence, who is sick with coral poisoning, does not reveal his illness when he puts Flannigan in charge of the mission and stays behind. Convinced now that Lawrence is a coward, the men angrily but efficiently complete their task, although "Pappy" Creighton (Jeffrey Hunter), whose brother is a U.S. Marine, sneaks onto the beach with Flannigan to leave a sign "welcoming" the Marines. Creighton is shot after the prank, but Flannigan tows him to the pick-up boat. Back on the ship, Creighton is put in traction because of the bullets in his spine, and Flannigan confesses to Lawrence that the prank caused Creighton's injuries. Lawrence furiously upbraids Flannigan for giving in to the prank, and soon all of the men request transfers.

While Lawrence is discussing the transfer requests with Vincent, a torpedo hits the ship but does not detonate. Lawrence volunteers to disarm the torpedo, which has lodged in the sick bay next to Creighton's bed, and with Flannigan's help, succeeds. Soon after, Lawrence receives orders to blow up a Japanese submarine pen, and tells the men that although it will be their last mission together, he is proud to have served with them. Although Flannigan voices disdain that Lawrence will again dodge dangerous duty, Lawrence leads the mission, which is discovered when one of the men accidentally trips a signal wire. Japanese sentries shoot at the men as they plant the charges, and Lawrence is stabbed in hand-to-hand combat with a Japanese diver. He orders Flannigan to leave him behind, but Flannigan tows him to safety. The mission is a success, and soon Lawrence is recuperating beside Creighton. Finally won over by Lawrence's bravery, the men show their acceptance of him by asking him to sign the portrait they have drawn of Cassidy to present to his widow.

Cast
Richard Widmark as Lt. Cmdr. John Lawrence 
Dana Andrews as Chief Jake Flannigan 
Gary Merrill as Lt. Cmdr. Pete Vincent 
Jeffrey Hunter as "Pappy" Creighton 
Warren Stevens as Ralph Hodges 
Robert Wagner as Lt. (jg) Franklin 
Harvey Lembeck as Marvin W. "Canarsie" Mikowsky 
Robert Rockwell as Lt. Bill Doyle 
Henry Slate as "Sleepy"

Production
Producer Paul Short of Allied Artists protested the use of the title The Frogmen by Twentieth Century-Fox, asserting that he had established prior claim to it. Eventually, Short dropped his claim and Twentieth Century-Fox was allowed to use the title. Short's production was never made. Several major studios were interested in producing films about the Underwater Demolition Teams, but only Twentieth Century-Fox obtained an exclusive guarantee of cooperation from the U.S. Navy.

Henry Hathaway, one of the studio's most well received directors, was originally set to direct the film, which was to feature Millard Mitchell in a starring role. Richard Conte was also originally set to play "Pete Vincent", while Jack Elam was first cast as "Sleepy", and Craig Hill was set to play "Lt. J. G. Franklin". Assistant director Dick Mayberry briefly filled in for director Lloyd Bacon when Bacon fell ill with influenza.

Producer Sam Engel wrote an original story, titled "Frogmen in Korea", as an intended follow-up to The Frogmen, but the project soon dissolved. A one-hour television remake of The Frogmen, titled Deep Water, was broadcast in May 1957 on the 20th Century-Fox Hour. The program was directed by Roy Del Ruth and starred Ralph Meeker (Lawrence), James Whitmore (Flannigan), and Richard Arlen (Vincent).

Because working conditions for The  Frogmen were deemed too "riotous" for women, all female roles were written out of the screenplay and none appeared in the completed film. Jack Warden makes an uncredited appearance in the beginning of the film as a crew member of the transport ship. Co-star Gary Merrill, in the role of the captain of UDT-4's transport ship, delivers the line of dialog, "Looks like you've got what amounts to a legal mutiny on your hands", that is virtually identical to a line that he spoke two years earlier in the World War II Army Air Force drama Twelve O'Clock High.

The filming of the submarine sequence took place on the deck of USS Kleinsmith (APD-134) while the ship was off Key West, FL on 11 January 1951. Much of the boat and high-speed transport scenes were shot between 15 January and 6 February 1951 from the deck of Kleinsmith, while the ship was off St. Thomas, U.S. Virgin Islands. USS Taconic (AGC-17) appeared as the command ship. As spoken in dialog, the submarine's name sounds like "USS Jackass 259", but is actually "USS Jack SS-259". The real USS Jack (SS-259) was not actually used in the film, as it was out of commission at the time.

Many United States Navy SEALs have cited this film as their inspiration for joining the SEAL Teams, including Richard Marcinko (the first Commanding Officer of SEAL Team Six and Red Cell), the Medal of Honor recipient Michael E. Thornton, and Dennis Chalker.

See also

 List of films featuring the United States Navy SEALs

References

External links

1950 films
1950 war films
American war films
Films about the United States Navy in World War II
Underwater action films
Films shot in the United States Virgin Islands
20th Century Fox films
Films directed by Lloyd Bacon
Films scored by Cyril J. Mockridge
American black-and-white films
1950s English-language films
1950s American films